Saundra is a given name and may refer to:

 Saundra Santiago, American actress most noted for her work on Miami Vice
 Saundra Quarterman, American actress most noted for her role on Hangin' with Mr. Cooper
 Saundra Edwards, American actress and model
 Saundra Smokes, American journalist 
 Saundra Meyer, American politician